The National Iraqi Alliance (NIA or INA; ; transliterated: al-Itilaf al-Watani al-Iraqi), also known as the Watani List, is an Iraqi electoral coalition that contested the 2010 Iraqi legislative election. The Alliance is mainly composed of Shi'a Islamist parties. The alliance was created by the Supreme Council for Islamic Revolution in Iraq (the at the time largest Shi'a party) to contest in the January 2005 and December 2005 under the name United Iraqi Alliance (UIA; ; transliterated: al-I'tilāf al-`Irāqī al-Muwaḥḥad), when it included all Iraq's major Shi'a parties. The United Iraqi Alliance won both those of elections however later fell apart after several major parties (most notably the Sadr Movement) left the alliance due to disputes with Prime Minister Nouri al-Maliki and the Supreme Council.

The component parties contested the 2009 provincial elections separately but later that year started negotiations to revive the list. In August 2009 they announced the creation of the National Iraqi Alliance for the 2010 parliamentary election, this time without Prime Minister Nouri al-Maliki's Islamic Dawa Party, which formed the State of Law Coalition. Later that year the two lists would re-unite again, forming the National Alliance.

January 2005 Parliamentary Election

The Alliance formed in the lead-up to the January 2005 elections from mainly Shi’ite groups most importantly the Supreme Council for the Islamic Revolution in Iraq, whose leader Abdul Aziz al-Hakim headed the list, and Islamic Dawa Party. Other important members included the secular Iraqi National Congress led by Ahmed Chalabi and the independent nuclear physicist Hussain Shahristani. It also included supporters of cleric Muqtada al-Sadr who preferred not to back his National Independent Cadres and Elites party, and a number of independent Sunni representatives. The coalition was widely believed to have been supported by senior Ayatollah Ali al-Sistani, the most widely respected religious figure in Iraq. Although Sistani offered no official endorsement, many in Iraq understood the UIA to be the "Sistani list."

The twenty-two parties included in the coalition, which was called List 228, were:
 Supreme Council for the Islamic Revolution in Iraq (SCIRI)
 Badr Organisation
 Islamic Dawa Party (al-Dawa)
 Islamic Dawa Party—Iraq Organisation
 Islamic Virtue Party
 Hezbollah Movement in Iraq
 Hezbollah al-Iraq
 Islamic Action Organisation
 Sayyid Al-Shuhadaa Organisation
 Shaheed Al-Mihrab Organisation
 Iraqi National Congress (INC)
 Centrist Assembly Party
 Islamic Fayli Grouping in Iraq
 Fayli Kurd Islamic Union
 First Democratic National Party
 Assembly “Future of Iraq”
 Justice and Equality Grouping
 Islamic Master of the Martyrs Movement
 Islamic Union for Iraqi Turkomans
 Turkmen Fidelity Movement

Many members of the Alliance had lived in exile in Iran, including Ibrahim al-Jaafari, Iraq's Prime Minister from 2005 to 2006, who led the Islamic Dawa Party. In 1980 thousands of al-Dawa supporters were imprisoned or executed after advocating replacing Saddam Hussein's secular Ba'ath Party government with an Islamic government. The Iranian government supported their efforts and allowed members of Al-Da’wa to seek exile in Iran.

The Alliance received 4.08 million votes (48.1%) in the election, which gave the bloc 140 seats on the 275-seat Council of Representatives of Iraq. The Alliance's nominees included 42 women. The Alliance formed a coalition Iraqi Transitional Government with the Democratic Patriotic Alliance of Kurdistan. Ibrahim al-Jaafari, leader of the Islamic Dawa Party, became the Prime Minister of Iraq and Jalal Talabani of the Kurdistani Alliance became the President of Iraq.

In March 2005, the Iraqi Turkmen Front agreed to join the UIA’s caucus in the National Assembly. In return, Sistani reportedly pledged support for the recognition of Iraqi Turkmen as a national minority.

December 2005 Parliamentary Election
The Iraqi National Congress left the alliance prior to the December 2005 elections, which also brought the Sadrist Movement more firmly into the Alliance. Al-Sistani also stated that he would not support any party in this election.

The election saw an increased turnout, mainly because the Sunni Arab population decided not to boycott. The alliance won 5.0 million votes (41.2%) an increase of 23% in the number of votes but a reduction of 6.9% in the vote share. They gained 128 seats, 12 fewer than the previous election.

Analysis of the seat allocation after the elections showed that the 109 district seats and 19 compensatory seats won by the UIA were split as follows:

Other parties include:

Centrist Coalition Party
Turkman Islamic Union of Iraq
Justice and Equality Assembly
Iraqi Democratic Movement
Movement of Hizbullah in Iraq
Turkmen Loyalty Movement
Saed Al Shuhada Islamic Movement
Al Shabak Democratic Gathering
Malhan Al Mkoter
Reform And Building Meeting
The Justice Community
Iraq Ahrar

Following the election, the Islamic Virtue Party withdrew from the Alliance, saying they wanted to "prevent blocs forming on a sectarian basis". This followed differences with Prime Minister Nouri al-Maliki over control of the Oil Ministry in the Government of Iraq from 2006. This was followed in September 2007 by the Sadrist Movement, who complained the Alliance was "dominated by some parties".

The Alliance formed a coalition with the Kurdistani Alliance, the Sunni Arab-majority Iraqi Accord Front and the secularist Iraqi National List. The Alliance nominated Jaafari for another term as Prime Minister, but his appointment was blocked by the Alliance's coalition partners. Nouri al-Maliki, a deputy leader of the Islamic Dawa Party was agreed instead.

National Iraqi Alliance: 2010 Parliamentary Election
The component parties of the United Iraqi Alliance contested the 2009 provincial elections separately and in August 2009 they announced a new coalition for the 2010 parliamentary election without Prime Minister Maliki's Islamic Dawa Party. The new alliance was called the National Iraqi Alliance. The chairman of the group is former Iraqi Prime Minister Ibrahim al-Jaafari.

The parties taking part in the National Iraqi Alliance for the 2010 elections include:

Supreme Islamic Iraqi Council (ISCI) - led by Ammar al-Hakim
Badr Organisation - led by Hadi al-Amiri
Hezbollah Movement in Iraq - led by Hassan al-Sari
Sayyid al-Shuhada - led by Daghir al-Musawi
Sadr Movement - led by Muqtada al-Sadr
National Reform Trend (Islah) - led by Ibrahim al-Jaafari
Islamic Virtue Party (Fadhilah) led by Abd al-Rahim al-Hasini
Islamic Dawa Party - Tanzim al-Dakhli - led by Abdul Karim al-Anizi
Iraqi National Congress (INC) - led by Ahmad Challabi
Anbar Salvation Council - led by Hamid Hayes
Solidarity Bloc (Tadamun) -  led by Qassim Daoud
Gathering of Justice and Unity - led by Sheikh al-Faiz
Turkmeneli Political Party
Shiite Turkmen Movement
Constitutional Monarchy Movement - led by Sharif Ali bin al-Hussein
The party belonging to the Bahr al-Ulloum family - led by Mohammad Bahr al-Ulloum
The party led by Khalid Abd al-Wahhab al-Mulla
Several Independent politicians.

Results

Among the five seats not belonging to the INA's 4 major parties, 1 seat went to ISCI affiliated Hezbollah in Iraq, 1 seat went to the Iraqi National Accord (Ahmad Challabi's seat) and 1 went to the Basra-based Shaykhi party: Gathering of Justice and Unity.

April 2014 parliamentary election
The alliance formed following the 2014 parliamentary election includes the Sadrist Movement. The coalition also includes the Badr Organization, the Al-Muwatin coalition and the State of Law Coalition.

References

External links
Washington Post article about the United Iraqi Alliance
 Iraqi Shias unveil poll coalition
The Iraqi newspaper “al-Adalah” published on Dec. 23 2004 the platform of the United Iraqi Alliance

Islamism in Iraq
Political party alliances in Iraq